Dray Bhăng is a rural commune of Cư Kuin District, Đắk Lắk Province, Vietnam.

References

Populated places in Đắk Lắk province
District capitals in Vietnam